The following is a list of Eurodance artists. Eurodance, which is also known as Eurohouse or Euro-NRG, is a genre of electronic dance music that originated in the late 1980s primarily in Europe. It combines elements from house, techno and hip hop.

0–9

20 Fingers
2 Brothers on the 4th Floor
2 Fabiola
2 Unlimited

A

A*Teens
Ace of Base
Aikakone
Alcazar
Alexia
Alice Deejay
Amber
Antique
Aqua
Army of Lovers
ATC

B

Basic Element
Basshunter
Bellini
B.G., the Prince of Rap
Black Box
La Bouche

C

Cappella
Captain Hollywood Project
Captain Jack
Cascada
Centory
Alex Christensen
Le Click
Colonia
Corona
Tina Cousins
Crazy Frog
Culture Beat
Cut 'N' Move

D

Daze
Def Dames Dope
DHT
DJ BoBo
DJ Encore
DJ Manian
DJ Sammy
Dr. Alban
Dune

E

E-Rotic
E-Type
Eiffel 65
Electro Team
Eu4ya
Tania Evans

F

Fragma
Fun Factory

G

Gala
General Base
Groove Coverage
Günther

H

Haddaway

I

Ian Van Dahl
Ice MC
Infernal
Infinity
Inna

J

Jenny B
Jam & Spoon

K

Leila K
Nosie Katzmann
Kim Kay

L

Livin' Joy
Loft
Love Inc.

M

Magic Affair
Masterboy
Maxx
Melodie MC
Milk Inc.
Mo-Do
Movetron
Mr. President

N

N-Trance
No Mercy

O

O-Zone

P

Pandora
Paradisio
Pharao
Prince Ital Joe

R

R.I.O.
Real McCoy
Rednex
Reset
Ruki Vverh!
Kate Ryan

S

Sash!
Santamaria
Scooch
Scooter
September
Serebro
Shanadoo
Snap!
Solid Base
Sound Factory
Soundstream
Spagna
Alexandra Stan
Staxx of Joy
Sunblock

T

T-Spoon
Technotronic
Melanie Thornton
Twenty 4 Seven

U

U96

V

Vengaboys

W

Waldo's People
Whigfield

Y

Yanou

See also
List of Eurodance songs

References

Bibliography

Eurodance
Eurodance